Pelturagonia cephalum, Mocquard's eyebrow lizard, is a species of agamid lizard. It is endemic to Indonesia.

References

Pelturagonia
Reptiles of Indonesia
Reptiles described in 1890
Taxa named by François Mocquard
Taxobox binomials not recognized by IUCN
Reptiles of Borneo